The 2020–21 CAF Confederation Cup qualifying rounds were played from 27 November 2020 to 21 February 2021. A total of 67 teams are competing in the qualifying rounds to decide the 16 places in the group stage of the 2020–21 CAF Confederation Cup.

Draw

The draw for the qualifying rounds was held on 9 November 2020 at the CAF headquarters in Cairo, Egypt.

The entry round of the 51 teams entered into the draw was determined by their performances in the CAF competitions for the previous five seasons (CAF 5-Year Ranking points shown in parentheses).

Format

In the qualifying rounds, each tie will be played on a home-and-away two-legged basis. If the aggregate score is tied after the second leg, the away goals rule will be applied, and if still tied, extra time will not be played, and the penalty shoot-out will be used to determine the winner (Regulations III. 13 & 14).

Schedule
The schedule of the competition is as follows.

Bracket
The bracket of the draw was announced by the CAF on 9 November 2020.

The 16 winners of the first round advance to the play-off round, where they will be joined by the 16 losers of the Champions League first round.

Preliminary round
The preliminary round, also called the first preliminary round, includes the 38 teams that did not receive byes to the first round.

|}

Tevragh-Zeina won 2–1 on aggregate.

Renaissance won 1–0 on aggregate.

USGN won 2–1 on aggregate.

TAS Casablanca won on walkover after GAMTEL withdrew from the second leg in Morocco citing financial constraints.

ASC Jaraaf won 3–1 on aggregate.

Al Mokawloon Al Arab won 10–1 on aggregate.

Al Ittihad won 7–1 on aggregate.

US Monastir won 3–2 on aggregate.

Namungo won on walkover after Al Rabita were disqualified by CAF due to violation of regulations from the club and the South Sudan Football Association.

2–2 on aggregate. AS Kigali won on away goals.

NAPSA Stars won 9–2 on aggregate.

1–1 on aggregate. Bravos do Maquis won on away goals.

Al Amal Atbara won 4–0 on aggregate.

Salitas won 2–1 on aggregate.

Green Eagles won 4–3 on aggregate.

Coton Sport won 2–1 on aggregate.

2–2 on aggregate. Bloemfontein Celtic won 3–2 on penalties.

3–3 on aggregate. Rivers United won 2–0 on penalties.

First round
The first round, also called the second preliminary round, will include 32 teams: the 13 teams that received byes to this round, and the 19 winners of the preliminary round.

RS Berkane won 2–0 on aggregate.

ES Sétif won on walkover after Renaissance were disqualified by CAF for failing to appear for the first leg in N'Djamena.JS Kabylie won 4–1 on aggregate.TAS Casablanca won 5–1 on aggregate.2–2 on aggregate. ASC Jaraaf won on away goals.Étoile du Sahel won 2–1 on aggregate.Pyramids won 4–2 on aggregate.US Monastir won 2–0 on aggregate.Namungo won 5–3 on aggregate.Orlando Pirates won on walkover after Sagrada Esperança withdrew from the second leg in South Africa citing health concerns caused due to the new COVID-19 variant.3–3 on aggregate. AS Kigali won on away goals.1–1 on aggregate. NAPSA Stars won on away goals.DC Motema Pembe won 3–1 on aggregate.Salitas won 3–0 on aggregate.Coton Sport won 3–0 on aggregate.Rivers United won 5–0 on aggregate.Play-off round
The play-off round, also called the additional second preliminary round, includes 32 teams: the 16 winners of the Confederation Cup first round, and the 16 losers of the Champions League first round.

The draw for the play-off round was held on 8 January 2021, 12:00 GMT (14:00 local time, UTC+2), at the CAF headquarters in Cairo, Egypt.

The teams were seeded by their performances in the CAF competitions for the previous five seasons (CAF 5-Year Ranking points shown in parentheses):
Pot A contained the 7 seeded losers of the Champions League first round.
Pot B contained the 7 unseeded winners of the Confederation Cup first round.
Pot C contained the 8 unseeded losers of the Champions League first round.
Pot D contained the 8 seeded winners of the Confederation Cup first round.
Teams from Pot A were drawn against teams from Pot B into seven ties, and teams from Pot C were drawn against teams from Pot D into eight ties.

The 15 winners of the play-off round will advance to the group stage to join RS Berkane, who advanced directly to the group stage as the winners of the first round with the best CAF 5-Year Ranking following Gazelle withdrawal from the competition after being transferred from the Champions League.1–1 on aggregate. Enyimba won 5–4 on penalties.Namungo won 7–5 on aggregateASC Jaraaf won 2–0 on aggregateCS Sfaxien won 5–2 on aggregate1–1 on aggregate. Raja Casablanca won 6–5 on penalties.Nkana won 3–2 on aggregateNAPSA Stars won 3–2 on aggregateSalitas won 3–2 on aggregateES Sétif won 2–1 on aggregateÉtoile du Sahel won 4–1 on aggregateCoton Sport won 2–0 on aggregate2–2 on aggregate. Al Ahly Benghazi won 8–7 on penalties.2–2 on aggregate. JS Kabylie won on away goals.Pyramids won 4–0 on aggregateOrlando Pirates won 4–0 on aggregate''

Notes

References

External links
CAFonline

1
November 2020 sports events in Africa
December 2020 sports events in Africa
January 2021 sports events in Africa
February 2021 sports events in Africa